Gustavo Marmentini dos Santos (born 8 March 1994) is a Brazilian professional footballer who plays as an attacking midfielder for Super League Greece club Lamia.

Career
Born in Cascavel, Paraná, Marmentini graduated from Atlético Paranaense's youth system, and was promoted to the main squad in June 2014. On 12 August he was loaned to Delhi Dynamos FC.

On 14 October Marmentini made his professional debut, coming on as a late substitute in a 0–0 home draw against FC Pune City. On the 25th he scored his first goal, the last of a 4–1 home routing over Chennaiyin FC. On 1 July 2015 it was announced that Marmentini would be retained by the club to participate in the 2015 Indian Super League.

On 7 July 2018, Marmentini was announced as a new signing for Alashkert.

On 26 July 2020 he signed with the Israeli Premier League club Hapoel Hadera.

References

External links
Atlético-PR official profile 
ISL profile

1994 births
Living people
People from Cascavel
Brazilian footballers
Association football midfielders
Club Athletico Paranaense players
Odisha FC players
Al-Ittihad Kalba SC players
FC Alashkert players
Hapoel Hadera F.C. players
Hapoel Be'er Sheva F.C. players
PAS Lamia 1964 players
UAE First Division League players
Israeli Premier League players
Super League Greece players
Brazilian expatriate footballers
Expatriate footballers in India
Expatriate footballers in the United Arab Emirates
Expatriate footballers in Armenia
Expatriate footballers in Israel
Expatriate footballers in Greece
Brazilian expatriate sportspeople in India
Brazilian expatriate sportspeople in the United Arab Emirates
Brazilian expatriate sportspeople in Armenia
Brazilian expatriate sportspeople in Israel
Brazilian expatriate sportspeople in Greece
Sportspeople from Paraná (state)